Colfax station is an Amtrak train station in Colfax, California. Served by the California Zephyr, it is unstaffed. The station was built in 1905 by the Southern Pacific Railroad and was restored in the early 21st century; in addition to a waiting room, the building also houses the Colfax Heritage Museum. The platform is movable to accommodate Union Pacific rotary snowplows, which are liable to scrape a platform eight inches above top of rail.

Between January 1, 1998, and February 13, 2000, a single round-trip of the Capitol Corridor terminated at Colfax. This service ended because of low ridership.

The station building was listed on the National Register of Historic Places in 1999 as Colfax Passenger Station, with the 1880-built freight depot listed separately as Colfax Freight Station.

References

External links

Amtrak Stations Database

Colfax, California
Amtrak stations in Placer County, California
Amtrak Thruway Motorcoach stations in Placer County, California
Former Southern Pacific Railroad stations in California
Railway stations in the United States opened in 1905
National Register of Historic Places in Placer County, California
Railway stations on the National Register of Historic Places in California